Jiawei Han  (born August 10, 1949) is a Chinese-American computer scientist and researcher. He currently holds the position of Michael Aiken Chair Professor in the Department of Computer Science at the University of Illinois at Urbana-Champaign. His research focuses on data mining, text mining, database systems, information networks, data mining from spatiotemporal data, Web data, and social/information network data.

Biography 
Born in Shanghai on 10 August 1949, Han received his BS from University of Science and Technology of China in 1979 and his PhD from the University of Wisconsin-Madison in Computer Science in 1985.

Currently he is a professor at the Department of Computer Science in the University of Illinois at Urbana-Champaign, where he teaches courses on Data Mining, Text Mining, and Information Networks. Han served as the Director of Information Network Academic Research Center (INARC) supported by Network Science Collaborative Technology Alliance (NSCTA) program of U.S. Army Research Lab (ARL) from 2009–2016, and the Co-Director of KnowEng, a BD2k (Big Data to Knowledge) research center funded by NIH in 2014–2019.

Han has chaired or served on over 100 program committees of international conferences and workshops, including PC co-chair of the Second International Conference on Knowledge Discovery and Data Mining (KDD 1996), 2005 (IEEE), International Conference on Data Mining (ICDM), Americas Coordinator of 2006 International Conference on Very Large Data Bases (VLDB). He also served as the founding Editor-In-Chief of ACM Transactions on Knowledge Discovery from Data.

He is an ACM Fellow and an IEEE Fellow. He received the 2004 ACM SIGKDD Innovations Award, and the 2005 IEEE Computer Society Technical Achievement Award. The book: Han, Kamber and Pei, "Data Mining: Concepts and Techniques" (3rd ed., Morgan Kaufmann, 2011) has been popularly used as a textbook worldwide. He was the 2009 winner of the McDowell Award, the highest technical award made by IEEE.

Bibliography
Data Mining: Concepts and Techniques, 3rd edition (with Micheline Kamber and Jian Pei), The Morgan Kaufmann Series in Data Management Systems, Jim Gray, Series Editor Morgan Kaufmann Publishers, 2011.

References

External links
 Data Mining Research Group
 Jiawei Han's academic website

1949 births
Living people
20th-century American scientists
20th-century American writers
21st-century Chinese scientists
21st-century Chinese writers
American computer scientists
American technology writers
Chinese computer scientists
Chinese emigrants to the United States
Chinese technology writers
Data miners
Fellow Members of the IEEE
Fellows of the Association for Computing Machinery
Scientists from Shanghai
Academic staff of Simon Fraser University
University of Illinois Urbana-Champaign faculty
University of Science and Technology of China alumni
University of Wisconsin–Madison College of Letters and Science alumni
Writers from Shanghai